Faistenau is a municipality in the Austrian state of Salzburg.

Geography
It is located in the district of Salzburg-Umgebung. It is a significant tourist destination, located in the Salzkammergut region known for its natural lakes.

Population
As of 15 May 2001 Faistenau had a population of 2,850, of whom 49.6% are male and 50.4% female. The earliest population records for Faistenau are from 1869, at which time the municipality had 1,103 inhabitants.

References

External links 
 Faistenau municipal council website (in German)
 Faistenau at Statistik Austria

Cities and towns in Salzburg-Umgebung District